The men's 100 kg competition in judo at the 2016 Summer Olympics in Rio de Janeiro was held on 11 August at the Carioca Arena 2.

The gold and silver medals were determined by a single-elimination tournament, with the winner of the final taking gold and the loser receiving silver.  Judo events awarded two bronze medals.  Quarterfinal losers competed in a repechage match for the right to face a semifinal loser for a bronze medal (that is, the judokas defeated in quarterfinals A and B competed against each other, with the winner of that match facing the semifinal loser from the other half of the bracket).

The medals for the competition were presented by Alex Gilady, Israel, member of the International Olympic Committee and the gifts were presented by Rovnag Adullayev, Azerbaijan Judo Federation president.

Results

Finals

Repechages

Pool A

Pool B

Pool C

Pool D

References

External links
 

M100
Judo at the Summer Olympics Men's Half Heavyweight
Men's events at the 2016 Summer Olympics